The 2009–10 National League 2 South was the first season (23rd overall) of the fourth tier (south) of the English domestic rugby union competitions since the professionalised format of the second division was introduced.  Previously known as National Division 3 South, it had been renamed due to widespread changes to the league system by the RFU with National One becoming the Championship, National 2 becoming National 1 and so on.  The league system was 4 points for a win, 2 points for a draw and additional bonus points being awarded for scoring 4 or more tries and/or losing within 7 points of the victorious team.  In terms of promotion the league champions would go straight up into National League 1 while the runners up would have a one-game playoff against the runners up from National League 2 North (at the home ground of the club with the superior league record) for the final promotion place. A further change to the league system would see the division increase from 14 to 15 teams (this was originally supposed to be 16 teams but one of the teams relegated from the 2008-09 National Division 2, Mounts Bay, folded at the beginning of the season).

Barking would finish as champions with only two league defeats all season, while runners up Rosslyn Park would join them in the 2010–11 National League 1 by defeating 2009–10 National League 2 North runners up Loughborough Students in the National 2 promotion playoff.  At the bottom of the table Bridgwater & Albion and newly promoted Barnes would be condemned to National League 3 South West and National League 3 London & SE respectively.

Participating teams
Eleven of the teams listed below participated in the 2008-09 National League 3 South season; Westcombe Park were relegated from the 2008-09 National Division 2, while Clifton were promoted as champions of South West Division 1 with Shelford (champions) and Barnes (playoffs) coming up from London Division 1.

League table
Notes:

Results

Round 1 

Bye: Ealing Trailfinders

Round 2 

Bye: Bridgwater & Albion

Round 3 

Bye: Rosslyn Park

Round 4 

Bye: Henley Hawks

Round 5 

Bye: Worthing Raiders

Round 6 

Bye: Southend

Round 7 

Bye: Westcombe Park

Round 8 

Bye: Clifton

Round 9 

Bye: Barnes

Round 10 

Bye: Shelford

Round 11 

Bye: Richmond

Round 12 

Bye: Lydney

Round 13 

Bye: Barking

Round 14 

Bye: Canterbury

Round 15 

Postponed.  Game rescheduled to 6 February 2010.

Postponed.  Game rescheduled to 6 February 2010.

Postponed.  Game rescheduled to 6 February 2010.

Postponed.  Game rescheduled to 6 February 2010.

Postponed.  Game rescheduled to 6 February 2010.

Postponed.  Game rescheduled to 6 February 2010.

Postponed.  Game rescheduled to 6 February 2010.
Bye: Dings Crusaders

Round 16 

Postponed.  Game rescheduled to 20 March 2010.

Postponed.  Game rescheduled to 20 March 2010.

Postponed.  Game rescheduled to 20 March 2010.
Bye: Bridgwater & Albion

Round 17 

Postponed.  Game rescheduled to 1 May 2010.

Postponed.  Game rescheduled to 1 May 2010.

Postponed.  Game rescheduled to 1 May 2010.

Postponed.  Game rescheduled to 1 May 2010.

Postponed.  Game rescheduled to 20 March 2010.

Postponed.  Game rescheduled to 20 March 2010.

Postponed.  Game rescheduled to 1 May 2010.
Bye: Rosslyn Park

Round 18 

Postponed.  Game rescheduled to 20 March 2010.

Postponed.  Game rescheduled to 19 March 2010.
Bye: Henley Hawks

Round 19 

Bye: Worthing Raiders

Round 20 

Postponed.  Game rescheduled to 8 May 2010.
Bye: Southend

Round 15 (Rescheduled games) 

Rescheduled from 19 December 2009.

Rescheduled from 19 December 2009.

Rescheduled from 19 December 2009.

Rescheduled from 19 December 2009.

Rescheduled from 19 December 2009.

Rescheduled from 19 December 2009.

Rescheduled from 19 December 2009.

Round 21 

Postponed.  Game rescheduled for 1 May 2010.
Bye: Westcombe Park

Round 22 

Bye: Clifton

Round 23 

Bye: Barnes

Round 24 

Bye: Shelford

Round 25 

Bye: Richmond

Round 17 (Rescheduled game) 

Rescheduled from 16 January 2010 and eventually cancelled altogether due to fixture congestion meaning both Westcombe Park and Shelford would only play 29 games each.

Rounds 16, 17 & 18 (Rescheduled games) 

Game rescheduled from 2 January 2010.

Game rescheduled from 16 January 2010.

Game rescheduled from 2 January 2010.

Game rescheduled from 9 January 2010.

Game rescheduled from 9 January 2010.

Game rescheduled from 2 January 2010.

Round 26 

Bye: Lydney

Round 27 

Postponed.  Game rescheduled to 8 May 2010.
Bye: Barking

Round 28 

Bye: Canterbury

Round 29 

Bye: Dings Crusaders

Round 30 

Bye: Ealing Trailfinders

Rounds 17 & 21 (Rescheduled games) 

Game rescheduled from 9 January 2010.

Game rescheduled from 9 January 2010.

Game rescheduled from 13 February 2010.

Game rescheduled from 9 January 2010.

Game rescheduled from 9 January 2010.

Game rescheduled from 9 January 2010.

Rounds 20 & 24 (Rescheduled games) 

Rescheduled from 3 April 2010.

Rescheduled from 30 January 2010.

Promotion play-off
Each season, the runners-up in the National League 2 South and National League 2 North participate in a play-off for promotion into National League 1. Loughborough Students were runners-up in the North and would host the game as they had a better record in the league in comparison to the South runners up Rosslyn Park.

Total season attendances

Individual statistics 

 Note that points scorers includes tries as well as conversions, penalties and drop goals.  Does not include North - South playoff game.

Top points scorers

Top try scorers

Season records

Team
Largest home win — 82 pts
96 - 14 Barking at home to Lydney on 17 April 2010
Largest away win — 72 pts
75 - 3 Rosslyn Park away to Westcombe Park on 6 February 2010
Most points scored — 96 pts
96 - 14 Barking at home to Lydney on 17 April 2010
Most tries in a match — 14
Barking at home to Lydney on 17 April 2010
Most conversions in a match — 13
Barking at home to Lydney on 17 April 2010
Most penalties in a match — 6 
Westcombe Park away to Henley Hawks on 5 September 2009
Most drop goals in a match — 3
Westcombe Park at home to Ealing Trailfinders on 5 December 2009

Player
Most points in a match — 31
 Craig Ratford for Barking at home to Lydney on 17 April 2010
Most tries in a match — 4 (x3)
 Rob Viol for Clifton at home to Richmond on 31 October 2009
 Paul Unseld for Rosslyn Park away to Westcombe Park on 6 February 2010
 James Strong for Rosslyn Park away to Henley Hawks on 27 March 2010
Most conversions in a match — 13
 Craig Ratford for Barking at home to Lydney on 17 April 2010
Most penalties in a match — 6 
 Lee Audis for Westcombe Park away to Henley Hawks on 5 September 2009
Most drop goals in a match — 3
 Lee Audis for Westcombe Park at home to Ealing Trailfinders on 5 December 2009

Attendances
Highest — 1,473  
Richmond at home to Rosslyn Park on 26 September 2009
Lowest — 30 
Barnes at home to Shelford on 20 February 2010
Highest Average Attendance — 566
Richmond
Lowest Average Attendance — 99
Barnes

See also
 English rugby union system
 Rugby union in England

References

External links
 NCA Rugby

2009-10
2009–10 in English rugby union leagues